Union Commercial Bank, may refer to:

Mauritius Commercial Bank (Madagascar), which was formerly known as Union Commercial Bank (UCB)
Union Commercial Bank (Sri Lanka), which is commonly known as the Union Bank